Lipscomb University Austin Center, formerly known as the Austin Graduate School of Theology, and the Institute for Christian Studies, is a private Christian seminary associated with the Churches of Christ and located in Austin, Texas. It is accredited by the Southern Association of Colleges and Schools Commission on Colleges to award bachelor's and master's degrees.

On January 1, 2021, the merger with Lipscomb University was completed and Austin Graduate School of Theology is now known as Lipscomb University Austin Center (LUAC). LUAC is a wholly-owned subsidiary of Lipscomb. It was announced that under the merger the graduate programs would be expanded to include Master of Divinity and Doctorate of Ministry programs.

On November 9, 2022, the office of the president of Lipscomb University would be closing the Austin center at the close of the Spring 2023 semester, citing a "number of challenges to successfully reviving the school" including the fallout of the COVID19 pandemic and the economic environment. Coincidentally, LUAC Director Michael Ross served as President of Ohio Valley University at its closure in the fall of 2021.

References

External links
Official website

Universities and colleges affiliated with the Churches of Christ
Seminaries and theological colleges in Texas
Reformed church seminaries and theological colleges
Universities and colleges accredited by the Southern Association of Colleges and Schools
Universities and colleges in Austin, Texas